Risdon is a suburb of Hobart, capital city of Tasmania. It is west of Risdon Vale.

History
It derives its name from Captain William Bellamy Risdon, second officer of the ship Duke of Clarence, which visited the area as part of Sir John Hayes' expedition in 1793. Risdon Post Office opened on 1 July 1864.  It was named "Gregson" during 1911.

Zinc works
Between 1916 and 1920 Electrolytic Zinc developed a zinc refinery, known as the "Risdon works", and an eponymously named suburb.

In 1956, as part of the refinery complex, EZ started a sulphate of ammonia plant.

The owners of the plant in 1987 considered expansion of the refinery.

Currently the zinc works and former workers housing area are found in Lutana.

Eucalyptus risdonii
Eucalyptus risdonii is native to this location and was the emblem of Geilston Bay High School.

References

 
Localities of City of Clarence